Glenn Meade is an Irish author. He was born in Finglas, Dublin in 1958. He has written fiction and plays.

Career
In the 1980s Meade wrote and directed a number of his own plays for the Strand Theatre in Dublin. He originally worked as a pilot trainer for Aer Lingus, before becoming a journalist for The Irish Times and Irish Independent newspapers. In 1994, he released his first novel, Brandenburg, which garnered much critical acclaim. Meade now writes full-time.

His books have been translated into 26 languages, including Swedish, French, German, Dutch, Spanish, and Turkish.

His work The Second Messiah was published in English in summer 2011, by Simon & Schuster in New York. Meade divides his time between Ireland, and on occasion, the USA.

He was one of the Irish delegates at the European Writers Conference in Istanbul in 2010.

Bibliography

Fiction
 Brandenburg (1994)
 Snow Wolf (1996)
 The Sands of Sakkara (1999)
 Resurrection Day (2002)
 Web of Deceit (2004)
 The Devil's Disciple (2006)
  The Second Messiah (2011)
 Seconds to Disaster (2012, with Ray Rohan)
 The Romanov Conspiracy (2012)
 The Last Witness (2014)
 Unquiet Ghosts (2017)

References 

1957 births
Living people
Irish novelists
Irish dramatists and playwrights
Irish male dramatists and playwrights
People from County Dublin
Irish male novelists